San Francisco Film Critics Circle Awards 2002
December 17, 2002

Best Picture: 
 The Pianist 
The 1st San Francisco Film Critics Circle Awards, honoring the best in film for 2002, were given on 17 December 2002.

Winners

Best Picture:
The Pianist
Best Director: 
Todd Haynes - Far from Heaven
Best Actor: 
Michael Caine - The Quiet American
Best Actress:
Isabelle Huppert - The Piano Teacher (La pianiste)
Best Supporting Actor: 
Chris Cooper - Adaptation.
Best Supporting Actress: 
Miranda Richardson - Spider
Best Foreign Language Film: 
Y Tu Mamá También • Mexico
Best Documentary:
Rivers and Tides
Most Promising Debut: 
Dylan Kidd - Roger Dodger
Special Citation:
Phillip Noyce - Rabbit-Proof Fence and The Quiet American
Jay Rosenblatt and Caveh Zahedi - Underground Zero

External links
2002 San Francisco Film Critics Circle Awards

References
Polanski's 'Pianist' tops S.F. Film Critics' list / Caine, Huppert named best actors

San Francisco Film Critics Circle Awards
2002 film awards
2002 in San Francisco